Orfina is a watch manufacturing company, known for its Porsche Design range. The company was founded in 1922.

Notable Appearances
 Sean Connery as James Bond in Never Say Never Again wears an Orfina Military Mark II
 Lewis Collins' character in Who Dares Wins wears a Porsche design Orfina.
 Martin Shaw's character Ray Doyle in The Professionals, episode Blackout wears a black Porsche design Orfina
 Tom Cruise wears an Orfina in Top Gun
 Chuck Norris and Lee Marvin, both wear Orfina watches in The Delta Force
 Brigitte Nielsen wears an Orfina watch during the robbery in Beverly Hills Cop II

References

External links
 Official Website

Swiss watch brands
Watch manufacturing companies of Switzerland
Design companies established in 1922
Swiss companies established in 1922
Manufacturing companies established in 1922